The 2019 Faroe Islands Premier League (referred to as Betri deildin menn for sponsorship reasons) was the 77th season of top-tier football in the Faroe Islands and the 15th under the current format.

HB Tórshavn were the defending champions, having won their 23rd title in the previous season. The season started on 10 March and ended on 26 October.

Teams

The champions of the 2018 1. deild, Ítróttarfelag Fuglafjarðar, replaced 07 Vestur, the last-placed team in the 2018 Faroe Islands Premier League.

It is the second consecutive season in which only one team went promoted from 1. deild, as they were the only non-reserve team in the top three.

Tvøroyrar Bóltfelag, FC Suðuroy and Royn ended their cooperation and TB replaced TB/FC Suðuroy/Royn.

League table

Positions by round

Results
Each team plays three times (either twice at home and once away or once at home and twice away) against every other team for a total of 27 matches each.

Rounds 1–18

Rounds 19–27

Top goalscorers

See also
 2019 Faroe Islands Cup

References

Faroe Islands Premier League seasons
1
Faroe
Faroe